Juan Guillermo Bonilla (born February 12, 1956) is a Puerto Rican former professional baseball player who played in the Major Leagues from 1981–1987 as a second baseman. He played for the San Diego Padres, Baltimore Orioles and New York Yankees.

Bonilla also played college baseball at Florida State University.

At the end of the 1983 season, at the direction of the Padres, Bonilla entered a drug treatment program due to his use of cocaine. He spent four weeks in the program and returned to the team in 1984 but was released during spring training. He did not get another job in baseball until the Yankees signed him in 1985.

See also
 List of Major League Baseball players from Puerto Rico

References

External links

 Florida State University statistics

1955 births
Living people
Albany-Colonie Yankees players
All-American college baseball players
Baltimore Orioles players
Chattanooga Lookouts players
Columbus Clippers players
Florida State Seminoles baseball players
Major League Baseball players from Puerto Rico
Major League Baseball second basemen
Major League Baseball third basemen
New York Yankees players
People from Santurce, Puerto Rico
Prince William Yankees players
San Diego Padres players
Tacoma Tigers players
Waterloo Indians players
University of Puerto Rico alumni